James Whittaker (1751–1787) was second leader of the Shakers.

James Whittaker may also refer to:

Other people
James Whittaker, founder of Whittaker's confectionery manufacturer in 1896
James Whittaker (footballer) (1882–1949), English footballer
James Whittaker (critic) (active 1921) from The Man Who Laughs
Jim Whittaker (born 1929), American mountaineer
Jim Bowen (real name James Whittaker, 1937–2018), English stand-up comedian
James William Whittaker, 19th century English painter

Fictional characters
James Whittaker in 1930 American film Such Is the Law
James Whittaker in 1945 American film Captain Eddie

See also
James Whitaker (disambiguation)